Out of the Dark is a two disc compilation album from Nuclear Blast Records to commemorate their 20 years as a record label. Produced by Peter Wichers, who is also the only songwriter on the album, it features a variable collection of "All Stars" much in the same vein as Roadrunner United.  The album includes 11 different singers, with Wichers playing bass and guitar, and drums by Dirk Verbeuren and Henry Ranta. It also includes a second disc which includes 10 songs from thrash metal, death metal and black metal bands signed to Nuclear Blast. While its "twin" album Into the Light focuses more on the power metal side of the label, Out of the Dark is rather devoted to the genre of melodic death metal.

Track listing

Disc 1

Disc 2
Dimmu Borgir – The Heretic Hammer (US Bonus "In Sorte Diaboli") (04:38)
Immortal – Tyrants (06:18)
Nile – As He Creates, So He Destroys (04:38)
Exodus – Purge the World (Japan Bonus "Shovel Headed Kill Machine") (04:02)
Anthrax - Ghost (01:56)
Meshuggah – Futile Bread Machine (Campfire Version) (Taken from "The True Human Design" EP) (03:30)
Chimaira - Kingdom of Heartache (Japan Bonus "Resurrection") (04:09)
All Shall Perish – Prisoner of War (04:44)
Agnostic Front – All is Not Forgotten (01:55)
Threat Signal – Counterbalance (05:39)
Total length: 41:22

Nuclear Blast America Version
Track 1 on disc 2 is Dimmu Borgir - "The Ancestral Fever" (European Bonus "In Sorte Diaboli") (05:51)
Track 5 on disc 2 is Bleed the Sky - "The Martyr" (05:51)
Track 7 on disc 2 is EPICA - "Replica" (Fear Factory cover) (04:10)

Personnel
 Peter Wichers - bass, guitars, keyboards
 Henry Ranta - drums (1, 2, 5, 6, 8)
 Dirk Verbeuren - drums (3, 4, 7, 9, 10)
 Mattias Nilsson - shakers, tambourine (5)

References

2007 compilation albums
Melodic death metal compilation albums
Nuclear Blast compilation albums
Thrash metal compilation albums
Record label compilation albums